Elena Semikina (born September 8, 1983) is a Russian-Canadian actress, executive producer, and beauty pageant titleholder. Semikina was crowned Miss Universe Canada 2010 in Toronto, Ontario, on June 14, 2010. She represented Canada at the Miss Universe 2010 beauty pageant held in Las Vegas, Nevada, U.S. on August 23, 2010. Semikina conceived and executive-produced the feature documentary film Our Man in Tehran, which premiered at the 2013 Toronto International Film Festival and set the record straight on the Iran hostage crisis after Ben Affleck's feature film, Argo, premiered at the same festival only one year prior.

In January 2020 Canadian authorities charged Semikina with criminally harassing her ex-lover Drew Taylor and his wife Jennifer over a period of five years. Semikina allegedly threatened both of them with bodily harm, threatened to raise false allegations against Taylor unless he advanced her film career, and also threatened to kill him. The case is on-going.

References

External links 
 

1983 births
Living people
Miss Universe 2010 contestants
Miss Universe Canada winners
Naturalized citizens of Canada
Actresses from Toronto
York University alumni
Canadian film actresses
Canadian people of Moldovan descent
Canadian people of Russian descent
Miss International 2008 delegates